Sri Vidhya Rajagopalaswamy temple is a Vaishnava shrine located in the town of Mannargudi, Tamil Nadu, India. The presiding deity is Rajagopalaswamy, a form of Krishna. The temple is called Dakshina Dvaraka (Southern Dvaraka) along with Guruvayoor by Hindus.

Originally this ancient temple was first constructed by Kulothunga Chola I at 10th century and Chola Kings Rajaraja Chola III, Rajendra Chola III and  later expanded by Thanjavur Nayaks during the 16th century. The temple has three inscriptions from the period and also mention in the religious texts. A granite wall surrounds the temple, enclosing all its shrines and seven of its nine bodies of water. The temple has a  rajagopuram, the temple's gateway tower. Haridra Nadhi, the temple tank associated with the temple is outside the temple complex and is considered one of the largest temple tanks in India.

Pundarikakshan is believed to have appeared as Krishna to sages Gopillar and Gopralayar.

Six daily rituals and three yearly festivals are held at the temple, of which the chariot festival, celebrated during the Tamil month of Panguni (March–April), being the most prominent. The temple is maintained and administered by the Hindu Religious and Endowment Board of the Government of Tamil Nadu.

Architecture

The history of Mannargudi in centered around the Rajagoplaswamy temple. The temple has a large gopuram (gateway tower) facing east with a temple tank in the north eastern direction. The central shrine is located axial to the gateway and the flagpost and approached through a series of pillared halls. The image of the presiding deity is 156 inches tall and sported in a seated posture with Sathyabhama and Rukmini on either of his sides. There is a big tank at the entrance of the shrine where rain water is collected. The temple complex has 16 gopurams (tower gateways), 7 prakarams (outer courtyard), 24 shrines, seven mandapams (halls) and nine sacred theerthams (temple tanks). The utsava (festival deity) is a bronze figure from the Chola period. It shows keshabanda type of coiffure and restrained ornamentation, atypical of the Chola bronzes of the 11th century. The temple has a thousand pillared hall.

History

The originally temple was first constructed by Kulothunga Chola I(1070-1125 A.D.) stone inscription found in the site.  The place Mannargudi is termed Sri Rajathi Raja Chathurvedhi Mangalam The Thanjavur Nayaks made the temple as their dynastic and primary shrine and made significant additions. The current temple structure, hall of 1000 pillars, main gopuram (temple gateway tower) and the big compound wall around the temple was built by the king Vijayaraghava Nayak(1532-1575 A.D.).  Raghunathabhyudayam, a doctrine by Nayaks explains the donation of an armour studded with precious stones to the main deity by the king.  He erected the big tower in the temple so that he can view the Srirangam Ranganathaswamy temple from the top of Mannargudi.  The Nayaks were specially interested in music and it was promoted in both the temples.  Instruments like Mukhavina, Dande, Kombu, Chandravalaya, Bheri and Nadhasvaram were commonly used in the temple service.

According to historian K.V. Soundararajan, the Rangantha temples in South India built during the 9th and 10th centuries have a systematic arrangement of subsidiary deities as seen in this temple along with the Appakkudathaan Perumal Temple at Koviladi, Sowmya Narayana Perumal temple at Thirukoshtiyur, Veeraraghava Perumal Temple at Thiruvallur and Rangantha temple at Srirangapatna.

Festival

The temple priests perform the puja (rituals) every day, including festivals. Like other Vishnu temples of Tamil Nadu, the priests belong to the Vaishnavaite Brahmin caste. The temple rituals are performed four times a day; Kalasanthi at 8:30 a.m., Uchikalam at 10:00 a.m., Sayarakshai at 6:00 p.m. and Ardha Jamam at 8:00 p.m. Each ritual comprises three steps; alangaram (decoration), neivethanam (food offering) and deepa aradanai (waving of lamps) for the presiding deity. The worship involves religious instructions in the Vedas (sacred text) read by priests and prostration by worshippers in front of the temple mast. There are weekly, monthly and fortnightly rituals.

The major festivals celebrated in the temple are 18-day Panguni Brahmotsavam. During the second day, the enactment of the famous story of Krishna taking away the dress of bathing females, the females requesting the clothes back and Krishna singing the flute.  The festival deity is placed in the pinnai tree, the branches of which are hung with garments and ornaments.  The chariot festival is the most prominent festival of the temple and the surrounding villages. It is celebrated during the Tamil month of Panguni (March–April); devotees pull a chariot round the streets of Mannargudi. Verses from the Nalayira Divya Prabandham are recited by a group of temple priests and music made with  nagasvaram (pipe instrument) and tavil (percussion instrument) is played. Vaikunta Ekadashi during December–January, Navarathri during September–October and butter pot breaking ceremony (locally called uri adi) are the other festivals celebrated in the temple.

Religious importance
Rajagoplaswamy temple has not been glorified by Alvars, though it is classified as one of the Abimana Stalas, which are considered holy temples in Vaishnava tradition. Thirumangai Alvar is believed to have built the tall flag post outside the temple with the help of cotton bales. He also is believed to have sung praises about the presiding deity, but the songs were lost with time. The other Alvars who are believed to have visited the temple at various periods were seemingly lost in memory under the beauty of the presiding deity and were at loss of words.

Though Alwars have not glorified this temple, Sri Purandara dasaru, a Kannada Hari dasa, known as Pithamaha of Carnatic music had visited this place and glorified the God by composing a Kannada song " Kande Mannaru Krisha na" and "Mannaru Krishnanege Mangala". He is from Vijaya nagara empire. Even Sri Vijaya Dasaru also has composed song on this God.

Notes

References

 
 

Krishna temples
Purana temples of Vishnu
Vishnu temples in Tiruvarur district
Dravidian architecture
Chola architecture